3R or three Rs may refer to:
 The three Rs, a widely used abbreviation for the basic elements of a primary school curriculum: reading, 'riting (writing), and 'rithmetic (arithmetic)
 The three Rs, a widely used abbreviation for the waste management hierarchy: reduce, reuse, and recycle
 The three Rs, an abbreviation for consumer remedies under Australian Consumer Law when consumer guarantees of goods are not satisfied: refund, replace, and repair
 The three Rs (animal research), principles for ethical use of animals in testing: replacement, reduction, refinement
 The 3Rs, an experimental short film by David Lynch
 3R Computers, Inc., a defunct American computer company based in Massachusetts
 3R (optical regenerator), an optical communications repeater that performs reamplification, reshaping, and retiming
 Intelsat 3R, a former communications satellite
 Yaesu VX-3R, an ultra-compact dual-band amateur radio transceiver
 British Rail Class 206, Southern Region designation 3R from 3-car Reading Line stock
 3R (print size), a standard consumer print size for photographs

 The 3Rs of Junior Forest Wardens (a Canadian outdoor-education program for families): Responsibility to yourself, Responsibility to others, Responsibility to your community and the planet
 Return, Reclamation, Rehabilitation, rebel group in Central African Republic
 Relief, recovery, and reform, programs that were designed under these three categories during the New Deal

See also these
RRR (disambiguation)
R3 (disambiguation)
 3RS, part of the Hong Kong International Airport Master Plan 2030